The 2018 Thai League Cup Final was the final match of the 2018 Thai League Cup, the 9th season in the second era of a Thailand's football tournament organised by Football Association of Thailand. It was played at the Thammasat Stadium in Pathum Thani, Thailand on 20 October 2018, between Chiangrai United a big team from the Northern part and Bangkok Glass a big team from the metropolitan region of Thailand.

Road to the final

Note: In all results below, the score of the finalist is given first (H: home; A: away; T1: Clubs from Thai League; T2: Clubs from Thai League 2; T4: Clubs from Thai League 4.

Match

Details

Assistant referees:
 Rachen Srichai
 Komsan Kamphaen
Fourth official:
 Wiwat Jumpa-on
Match Commissioner:
 Peerapol Pu-udom
Referee Assessor:
 Pirom Un-prasert

Winner

Prizes for winner
 A champion trophy.
 5,000,000 THB prize money.

Prizes for runners-up
 1,000,000 THB prize money.

See also
 2018 Thai League
 2018 Thai League 2
 2018 Thai League 3
 2018 Thai League 4
 2018 Thai FA Cup
 2018 Thai League Cup

References

External links
Thai League cup snapshot from Thai League official website

2018
2